Palazzone is a village in Tuscany, central Italy, administratively a frazione of the comune of San Casciano dei Bagni, province of Siena. At the time of the 2001 census its population was 310.

Palazzone is about 102 km from Siena and 11 km from San Casciano dei Bagni.

References 

Frazioni of the Province of Siena
San Casciano dei Bagni